The Protection of Young Persons Act (German: Jugendschutzgesetz or JuSchG) is a federal law in Germany to enforce youth protection in public spaces and regulate media consumption by minors. The act does not apply to minors who are married.

History

General history 
On 4 December 1951 the "Law for the Protection of Minors in Public" (Gesetz zum Schutze der Jugend in der Öffentlichkeit (JÖSchG)) was enacted and came into force on 6 January 1952 in West Germany. The law was revised and re-enacted multiple times until in 2003 the law as well as the former "Gesetz über die Verbreitung jugendgefährdender Schriften und Medieninhalte (GjSM)" were merged into the newly legislated "Jugendschutzgesetz (JuschG)" which came into force along with the "Jugendmedienschutz-Staatsvertrag" in the federal states of Germany.

A forerunner of the law was the "Lichtspielgesetz" from 1920, which restricted the publication of movies in cinemas without former approval and review by a central commission. During the Nazi regime in Nazi Germany, the highly controversial "Polizeiverordnung zum Schutze der Jugend" (Police Ordinance for the Protection of the Youth) came into force, which introduced punishments for the minor as well as the responsible adult failing to follow the regulation of the law. (RGBl. I S. 349). This law was in effect until the newly formed Federal Republic of Germany enacted the new "Law for the Protection of Minors in Public" in 1951.

Recent changes 
 Amendment 1 September 2007: by passing the "Gesetz zum Schutz vor den Gefahren des Passivrauchens" (Act for the prevention of danger by passive smoking) on 20 July 2007 § 28 Sec. 1 Nr. 12 and § 10 Sec. 1 JuSchG where amended. From now on the sale, distribution and supply of tobacco products is prohibited to all children and young people under the age of 18 years. Prior to the amendment the minimum age to purchase, possess and to be permitted to smoke in public was 16 years of age. The operators of cigarette vending machines had time until 1 January 2009 to adjust (by adding an ID/Debitcard scanner to check the buyers age) or remove their machines to ensure that cigarettes and tobacco products could not be bought by minors.
 Amendement 1 July 2008: coming into force on 1 July 2008, a "Killerspiele" (killer games) ban was introduced meaning that from now on media that display "besonders realistische, grausame und reißerische Darstellungen selbstzweckbehafteter Gewalt beinhalten, die das Geschehen beherrschen" (especially realistic, gruesome and luridly depictions of self-inflicted violence which dominates the occurrence) are automatically considered as heavily harmful for minors which results in a general ban to advertise the video game, movie or other form of media and sales are solely restricted to under-the-counter sales for adults. Additionally, the "BPjM" was given power to put games, movies or other type of media onto the index if they:
 display self-inflicted murder or slaughter scenes or
 display frontier justice as the only way to enforce the alleged justice
 Amendment 1 January 2009: the restrictions for cigarette vending machines (see above) come into force.
 Amendment 3 March 2016: by passing the "Gesetz zum Schutz von Kindern und Jugendlichen vor den Gefahren des Konsums von elektronischen Zigaretten und elektronischen Shishas" (Act for the prevention of children and young people from the dangers of consuming electronic cigarettes and electronic hookahs) § 10 JuSchG was changed resulting in a ban of sales of e-cigarettes, e-hookahs as well as their cartridges (with and without nicotine) to children and young people under the age of 18 years. This amendment came into force on 1 April 2016.

Summary 

The Protection of Young Persons Act regulates:
 how long a minor may stay at specific public spaces such as
 bars and restaurants
 clubs/discotheques
 public spaces, events or establishments which are considered harmful for the youth
 gambling establishments
 the minimum age to sell to and permit minors to consume alcohol in public.
 the minimum age to sell to and permit minors to consume tobacco products and electronic cigarettes in public.
 the age restrictions for games and movies which have to be enforced by cinemas, public/private broadcasters and stores selling movies and video games.
 responsibility of the Freiwillige Selbstkontrolle der Filmwirtschaft (FSK) and the Unterhaltungssoftware Selbstkontrolle (USK) to issue age ratings for movies and video games.
 responsibility of the Bundesprüfstelle für jugendgefährdende Medien  (Federal Department for Media Harmful to Young Persons) to index games, movies or other type of media and restrict sale and distribution. Also to enforce a general advertising ban for media which are considered liable to have an undesirable influence on the moral development of young people, especially media depicting glorification of war, displaying human beings in a way that violates their dignity as well as depiction of children or juveniles in an erotic or sexual manner.

Table summary 

1 Unaccompanied children <16 years only permitted in a restaurant or licensed premises during the time of 5 a.m until 11 p.m. to consume a meal or a have a non alcoholic beverage.
2 No restrictions if accompanied by a parent or legal guardian.
3 The consumption of beer, wine, wine-like beverages or sparkling wine or mixtures of beer, wine, wine-like beverages or sparkling wine and soft drinks in public is generally permitted for minors aged 16 years or older. However, if the minor is accompanied by his parent or legal guardian the age limit the consume such beverages drops down to 14 years.
4 If specific age-limit for movies/games/arcades are followed.

Enforcement 

Contrary to the former "Polizeiverordnung zum Schutze der Jugend", the "Jugendschutzgesetz" does not penalize children and young people but rather the responsible adult failing to enforce the provisions of the law. All licensed premises and operators of events have to place a clearly-legible copy of the act at the premises or place of event.

Making media which is indexed for being considered "harmful to young persons" accessible to minors as well as violating further provisions which are set out in § 15, 21 and 28 JuSchG can be prosecuted by imprisonment up to one year or a fine.

Violations in context of protection of young persons in the public are considered a misdemeanor/regulatory offence, which can be fined up to €50,000.

Gambling in casinos 
Gambling in a licensed casino (Spielbank) is additionally to the general prohibition for minors to participate in gambling by the Protection of Young Persons Act, prohibited by state law in all German states. The age limit varies with 14 out of 16 states requiring a minimum age of 18 years to participate in gambling and enter a licensed casino. However Bavaria and Baden-Württemberg are the only two states that require a minimum age of 21 years.

Aspects which are not covered by the law 
 The age restrictions for the sale and furnishment of fireworks and other pyrotechnical items is not covered by the Protection of Young Persons Act but rather by the Verordnung zum Sprengstoffgesetz (Ordinance for the Explosives Act).
 Contrary to popular belief, the Protection of Young Persons Act does not include a general curfew but rather restricts minors from entering or staying at certain establishments or location which are open to the public (such as bars, discotheques, brothels and nightclubs). How long a minor is permitted to stay in public (besides mentioned establishments) is generally upon the parents' decision.
 Even though all sales of tobacco products are prohibited to minors, since 1 September 2007, the sale of smoking accessories such as bongs, hookahs, cigarette papers, lighters, pipes or herb grinders is not regulated, and thus sale is permitted to minors. However, in Bavaria, the sale of lighters is prohibited to children under the age of 12 years. Additionally, many retailers such as Rewe or Edeka have their own guidelines that restrict the sale of smoking accessories to children under 16 or 18 years of age.

Literature 
 Manfred Günther: Child and Youth Welfare Law in Germany. An overview for educators, psychologists, paediatricians and politicians, Springer Nature Wiesbaden 2022. ISBN 978-3-658-38289-6; E-book 978-3-658-3829-2

Notes 

Law of Germany